The Highlands-Sea Bright Bridge is a bridge connecting Highlands, New Jersey in the west to Sea Bright, New Jersey in the east, across the Shrewsbury River. The eastern terminus is at the entrance to Sandy Hook. The span is part of Route 36.

History
Several bridges have occupied the site. The first was a wooden beam bridge which lasted three years from 1872 to 1875. The second, a combination wood and steel swing bridge, was constructed in 1878 and lasted until demolition in 1949, though it was closed to traffic in 1933. The third bridge was a 1,240-foot bascule drawbridge, built in 1932 and opened the following year. In October 1991, the New Jersey Department of Transportation (NJDOT) recommended the replacement of the Highlands drawbridge with a 55-foot fixed-span bridge. According to an engineering study, replacement was believed to save $20 million over the cost-improvement actions outlined in a previous report that recommended extensive upgrades and partial replacement of bridge deck and superstructure. From August 1991 to 2002, several reports and studies by the NJDOT determined the general design and requirements for the replacement bridge. Of the many possible options one notable alternative was to build a second drawbridge and maintain both at the same time. By February 2002 the option of a  fixed-span bridge was approved, and by 2007 the design of the bridge was complete and the contract awarded to J.H. Reid General Contractor with a budget of $124 million.

Between 2008 and 2011, the new fixed-span bridge was constructed to replace the aging drawbridge. The spans are made of approximately 150 precast, post tensioned concrete box girders weighing between 30 and 70 tons each and achieve spans nearly twice the length of the steel spans of the original bridge. Because the new bridge was built in place of the old bridge, workers needed to demolish half of the old bridge and then construct half of the new bridge. After the first half of the new bridge was completed traffic was shifted to the new span, and the other half of the old bridge was demolished, making way for the second half of the new bridge. Construction of the new bridge began in February 2008 and was opened to traffic in December 2010. The entire project was completed in the spring of 2011. A ribbon-cutting ceremony occurred on May 1, 2011 to dedicate the newly constructed bridge. Several state and local officials attended the ceremony.

In October 2012, the bridge became a life saver for the remaining residents of Sea Bright as the historic storm surge pushed ashore during Superstorm Sandy.  It was reported that members of the Sea Bright Fire, Police and First Aids abandoned the town and stationed themselves on the highest remaining points in the area.  The second bridge, the Rumson Bridge, which span the Shrewsbury River, was also utilized.  After the storm passed, an estimated 90% of the town was said to be wiped out and uninhabitable.

References

External links

History of the Highlands
NJDOT Website

Bridges completed in 1933
Bridges completed in 2011
Sandy Hook, New Jersey
Sea Bright, New Jersey
Highlands, New Jersey
Road bridges in New Jersey
Bridges in Monmouth County, New Jersey
Concrete bridges in the United States
Box girder bridges in the United States
Cantilever bridges in the United States